The Lantern Museum is located in Vitoria-Gasteiz, Álava, Basque Country, Spain. It houses the lanterns used in the Rosary of the Lanterns procession, celebrated every 4th of August during the Virgen Blanca Festivities.

History 
The Rosary procession has been celebrated since the early 17th century, but lanterns weren't introduced until 1895. They were made of metal and glass, with candles being used to light them. The building which houses the lanterns throughout the year was built in 1901, with the support of then mayor Federico Baraibar. It was designed by local architect .

The building was reformed in 2000, when it opened as a museum. The museum was enlarged in 2014 by joining the existing facilities with an adjacent building.

Collection 
As of 2019, the museum housed a total of 273 lanterns. These include a Great Cross representing the Virgen Blanca, two columns of faith, and a lantern for each of the Mysteries of the Rosary (except for the Luminous Mysteries, represented by a single lantern). The prayers of the Rosary are represented by 15 lanterns corresponding to the Lord's Prayer, 150 for the Hail Mary, and 15 for the Gloria Patri. There's also 9 of them representing kyries, 53 litanies, 3 Agnus Dei, a Hail Mary and 5 salutations.

The last lanterns to be added to the collection were built in 2020, but their first procession was delayed until 2022 due to the COVID-19 pandemic. The twelve lanterns represent the prayers of the Rosary.

References

External links 
 
 
 Brochure at the Vitoria-Gasteiz city council website

Museums in Vitoria-Gasteiz
2000 establishments in the Basque Country (autonomous community)
Museums established in 2000
Religious museums in Spain